Educational Research Review is a triannual peer-reviewed academic review journal covering education. It was established in 2006 and is published by Elsevier on behalf of the European Association for Research on Learning and Instruction (EARLI). The editor-in-chief is Hans Gruber (University of Regensburg). According to the Journal Citation Reports, the journal has a 2017 impact factor of 4.973.

References

External links

Publications established in 2006
Triannual journals
Elsevier academic journals
Educational psychology journals
English-language journals…
Review journals
Academic journals associated with international learned and professional societies of Europe